Fatmir Ismaili (born 1949) is an Albanian footballer. He played in one match for the Albania national football team in 1973.

References

External links
 

1949 births
Living people
Albanian footballers
Albania international footballers
Place of birth missing (living people)
Association footballers not categorized by position